CEPA may refer to:
 Economic Partnership Agreement between the CARIFORUM states and the EU, concluded on 30 October 2008
 Comprehensive Economic Partnership Agreement, as (CEPA between India and Republic of Korea, enforced on 1 January, 2010).
 Comprehensive and Enhanced Partnership Agreement between the European Union and Armenia
 Canadian Environmental Protection Act
 Center for Economic Policy Analysis at New School University, New York City
 Center for Education Policy Analysis
 Center for European Policy Analysis
 Closer Economic Partnership Arrangement (disambiguation), between the Central Government of the People's Republic of China and its Special administrative regions (Hong Kong, Macau)
 Mainland and Hong Kong Closer Economic Partnership Arrangement (CEPA)
 CEPA (Common Educational Proficiency Assessment)
CEPA in foreign languages
 Centro Ponceño de Autismo, Ponce, Puerto Rico

zh:CEPA